At least three ships of the French Navy have borne the name La Galissonnière:

 , lead ship of the  launched in 1872 and stricken in 1894
 , lead ship of the  launched in 1933 and scuttled in 1942. Raised by Italy in 1943 and renamed FR 12, she was again sunk in 1944
 , sixth and last ship of the  launched in 1960 and decommissioned in 1990.

French Navy ship names